Sidi Brahim a  commune of Sidi Bel Abbès Province of Algeria
Sidi Brahim (wine), range of branded wines produced in the Atlas mountains, mainly in Algeria but also in Tunisia and Morocco
Sidi Brahim Barracks, former army barracks in Étain, France
Sidi Brahim Riahi (1766-1850), Tunisian ambassador, theologian and saint

See also
Battle of Sidi-Brahim, in French Algeria between Berber and French troops, 22 to 25 September 1845